Carlos Ortiz Jiménez (born 3 October 1983), commonly known as Ortiz, is a Spanish futsal player who plays for FC Barcelona as a Defender. In 2020 he was awarded a spot in the 2020 FutsalFeed's Best Team of the Year Award.

Honours
UEFA Futsal Champions League
 Champion: 2008–09
 Fourth place: 2018–19
FIFA Futsal World Cup
 Runner-up: 2008
UEFA Futsal Championship
 Champion: 2007
Supercopa de España de Futsal
 Winner: 2009
Copa de España de Futsal
 Winner: 2009
Revelation player of LNFS (06/07)
Best Team of the Year: Defender (2020)

References

External links
LNFS profile
RFEF profile
UEFA profile

1983 births
Living people
Futsal defenders
Sportspeople from Madrid
Spanish men's futsal players
Inter FS players
Xota FS players
FC Barcelona Futsal players